Vilkij may refer to:
 Vilkij District
 Vilkij-e Jonubi Rural District
 Vilkij-e Markazi Rural District
 Vilkij-e Shomali Rural District